Fu Chengyi (7 October 1909 – 8 January 2000) was a Chinese geophysicist and an academician of the Chinese Academy of Sciences.

Biography 
Fu was born into an official family in Minhou County, Fuzhou, on 7 October 1909. His father Fu Yangxian was a diplomat in the Beiyang government. He had three siblings. His elder brother Fu Ying was a chemist and vice president of Peking University. He elementary studied at Beijing Yuying Middle School and secondary studied at Huiwen High School. In 1929, he was accepted to Tsinghua University, majoring in the Department of Physics. After graduating in 1933, he stayed at the university and worked as assistant there. In 1938, he was recruited by the National Southwestern Associated University as an instructor. 

In 1939, he was admitted to the UK overseas student at government scholarships, but he did not make the trip because of the outbreak of World War II. In 1940, he entered the Department of Physics, McGill University in Canada and studied geophysical exploration under the supervision of D. A. Keys, and received his master's degree in physics in 1941. In 1942, D. A. Keys recommended him to the Graduate School of California Institute of Technology to study geophysics and seismology under the guidance of Beno Gutenberg, a leader in modern geophysics. He earned his doctor's degree in physics in 1946. After university, he worked as a technical consultant in several oil and geophysical exploration companies. In 1946, he was hired by California Institute of Technology as an assistant professor. 

In the spring of 1947, he received a letter from Zhao Jiuzhang, his university classmate and director of the Institute of Meteorology of the Academia Sinica, hoping him would return to China to preside over the geophysical research work of the Institute of Meteorology. Two weeks later, he returned to China and became a senior researcher in the Institute of Meteorology and a professor in the Department of Physics, Central University (now Southeast University). After the Chinese Civil War, the Nationalist government wanted him to go to Taiwan, but he refused.

In April 1950, the Chinese Academy of Sciences founded the Institute of Geophysics, Fu served as a researcher. In 1953, he moved to Beijing Institute of Geology (now China University of Geosciences (Beijing)), where he established the first geophysical teaching and research office in China. He also helped set up a teaching and research office of geophysics in Peking University in 1956. Fu joined the faculty of the University of Science and Technology of China in 1964, he established the teaching and research office of geophysics of which he himself served as the first director. In 1972, he founded the Focal Physics Research Office at the university. He joined the Communist Party in 1981.

On 8 January 2000, he died of illness in Beijing, aged 90.

He was a member of the 2nd, 5th and 6th National Committee of the Chinese People's Political Consultative Conference. He was a delegate to the 3rd National People's Congress.

Honours and awards 
 1957 Member of the Chinese Academy of Sciences (CAS)

References

External links 
Biography of Fu Chengyi on the official website of the Chinese Academy of Sciences 

1909 births
2000 deaths
People from Minhou County
Scientists from Fujian
Chinese geophysicists
Tsinghua University alumni
McGill University alumni
California Institute of Technology alumni
California Institute of Technology faculty
Academic staff of Peking University
Academic staff of Southeast University
Academic staff of the University of Science and Technology of China
Members of the Chinese Academy of Sciences
Delegates to the 3rd National People's Congress
Members of the 2nd Chinese People's Political Consultative Conference
Members of the 5th Chinese People's Political Consultative Conference
Members of the 6th Chinese People's Political Consultative Conference